Teofil Ociepka (April 22, 1891, in Janów Śląski – January 15, 1978, in Bydgoszcz) was a Polish self-taught primitivist painter, occultist, and theosophist. Along with Nikifor, he was one of the best known Polish primitivists.

Life
His occupation was a miner, working at the Giesche's coal mine in Katowice as a machinist in the power plant. During World War I he served as a soldier in the German Army, where he was introduced to occultism. When he returned to Janów, he brought back with him the first works on occultism, including Athanasius Kircher's treatise on the Seventy Two Names of God. On the recommendation of his Swiss mentor, Philip Hohmann of Wittenberg, with whom he maintained steady correspondence, Ociepka became a member of the Rosicrucian Lodge and attained the status of Master of Secret Sciences. On Hohmann's direction, he organized a strong occultist community in Janów. He maintained contact with the Julian Ochorowicz Parapsychological Society of Lvov. He believed that he had a spiritual link with his master who telepathically inspired his art.
Hohmann persuaded Ociepka to start painting circa 1927. He gave up his attempts in 1930 after receiving criticism from Tadeusz Dobrowolski, a Polish professor of art history and museum curator. He probably returned to painting either before or during World War II.

After the war, he gained a supporter in the author Isabel Czajka-Stachowicz, who in 1948 organized for him an exhibition in Warsaw, promoting him as "Polish Douanier Rousseau." She was aided by her friends, Julian Tuwim and Jan Kott. The Warsaw exhibition launched Ociepka's great world-class artistic career.

He saw his painting as God's mission, and so tried to portray absolutist themes, including the struggle between Good and Evil. His paintings depicting the imaginary fauna and flora of Saturn relate to the Rosicrucian ideology. During the early 1950s, in an attempt at political correctness, they were interpreted as Paleozoic Era landscapes. Later, his works depicted themes from fairy tales, legends, and lives of miners. They are characterized by wealth of imagination and bright, rich colors. The themes of his works, especially those from before 1956, were criticized as not adhering to the canon of socialist realism.

In 1946 Ociepka partnered with Otto Klimczok to found an art group. In 1947 the group was reorganized as an Art Circle associated with the Cultural Center "KWK Wieczorek", which during the 1950s provided a base for a talented group of amateur artists. The group was known as "Janowska Group" after its birthplace, or more formally, as the Circle of Non-professional Painters. Ociepka was a member until 1959, when he permanently moved to join his wife in Bydgoszcz. Under her influence he broke contact with the Janowska Group and distanced himself from occultism. He died on January 15, 1978, from a brain aneurysm.

Teofil Ociepka was one of the main characters portrayed in the 2002 movie Angelus.

Selected works
 Self-portrait
 Miner
 Hydra
 Lion from Saturn
 Bear from Saturn
 Three Headed Dragon

References
 Karolina Maria Hess and Malgorzata Alicja Dulska, "Teofil Ociepka", World Religions and Spirituality Project, June 9, 2017.
 Alfred Ligocki: Teofil Ociepka, Wydawnictwo Artystyczno-Graficzne RSW Prasa, 1967
 Joanna Tofilska: Katowice Nikiszowiec. Miejsce, ludzie, historia. Katowice: Muzeum Historii Katowic, 2007, s. 142, 143. .

External links
 Seweryn A. Wisłocki, Master Teofil Ociepka: Between the Authorities and the Truth
 Angelus (2000)
 Angelus
 Teofil Ociepka - sztuka naiwna

1891 births
1978 deaths
20th-century Polish painters
20th-century Polish male artists
Polish occultists
Polish male painters
Artists from Bydgoszcz